Stanisław Taczak (8 April 1874, Mieszków (now in Jarocin County) – 2 March 1960, Malbork) was a Polish general. Until 8 January 1919, he was temporary commander-in-chief of the Great Poland Uprising (1918-1919).

After the invasion of Poland in 1939, he was imprisoned in the Oflag VII-A Murnau POW camp in Germany.

Honours and awards
 Silver Cross of the Virtuti Militari
 Commander's Cross of the Order of Polonia Restituta
 Cross of Independence
 Cross of Valour (twice)
 Knight's Cross of the Legion of Honour (France)

1874 births
1960 deaths
People from Jarocin
People from the Province of Posen
Greater Poland Uprising (1918–1919) participants
Polish people of the Polish–Soviet War
Polish generals
World War II prisoners of war held by Germany
Polish military personnel of World War II
Polish prisoners of war
Recipients of the Silver Cross of the Virtuti Militari
Recipients of the Cross of Independence
Commanders of the Order of Polonia Restituta
Recipients of the Cross of Valour (Poland)
Chevaliers of the Légion d'honneur
Member of the Tomasz Zan Society